Anton-Leander Donkor (born 11 November 1997) is a German professional footballer who plays as a left-back or left winger for  club Eintracht Braunschweig.

Career
In January 2017, Donkor joined Premier League side Everton on loan until the end of the season, joining up with the club's under-23 side. In July 2017, after an injury hit first spell, he rejoined Everton on loan until January 2018. On 12 June 2019, Donkor joined FC Carl Zeiss Jena on a two-year deal. On 26 July 2020, Donkor joined SV Waldhof Mannheim.

On 8 June 2022, he moved to Eintracht Braunschweig with a two-year contract.

Honours
Hansa Rostock
 Mecklenburg-Vorpommern Cup: 2018–19

Everton U23
 Premier League 2 Division 1: 2016–17

References

External links
 
 
 

1997 births
Living people
Sportspeople from Göttingen
Footballers from Lower Saxony
German footballers
German sportspeople of Ghanaian descent
Germany youth international footballers
Association football wingers
VfL Wolfsburg II players
Everton F.C. players
FC Hansa Rostock players
FC Carl Zeiss Jena players
SV Waldhof Mannheim players
Eintracht Braunschweig players
3. Liga players
Regionalliga players
2. Bundesliga players
German expatriate footballers
German expatriate sportspeople in England
Expatriate footballers in England